The UK Film Council Completion Fund is a major UK short film funding awards scheme, funded by the UK Film Council, and managed by Maya Vision International.  Originally a £50,000 fund awarded on an annual basis to a slate of 8-10 film, from 2008 onwards
the fund has been increased to £70,000 to be awarded on a bi-annual basis to around 14 films of the most promising UK short films "that have already been shot but lack the funds to finish".

Screenings

At the scheme's launch in 2002, the 2003 slate of films were co-funded by Film4 Productions' Filmfour Lab and screened on Channel 4, Film 4 and a selection are still available on the Film 4 website.  After the winding down of Film Four Ltd as a separate entity and the scaling down and re-integration of film production into Channel 4 drama in 2002, the UK Film Council took over sole funding of the completion fund.  Since 2004, the finished films have played at the Edinburgh International Film Festival in a section called First Past the Post and also have a central London showcase at the Curzon Mayfair.  A selection of the films are available to screen on the BBC Film Network.

Archive

The UK Film Council takes delivery of a Digibeta copy of each film for preservation in its national archive in Sheffield and DVD copies are stored by the Edinburgh International Film Festival as part of the Film UK Guide to British Film archive.

Awards and nominations

Completion fund films have been official selections at numerous film festivals worldwide, gathering over 150 major international awards, and many more nominations, including:

 Nominated BAFTA Award for Best Short Film 2010 Off Season 
 Nominated BAFTA Award for Best Short Film 2009 Ralph
 Winner Short Film - Prix UIP Cracow 2007 Dad
Nominated European Film Awards Short Film – Prix UIP 2007 Dad
 Winner 60th Edinburgh International Film Festival Best British Short 2006 The Other Man
 Winner BAFTA Award for Best Short Film 2006 Antonio's Breakfast
 Nominated BAFTA Award for Best Short Film 2005 Lucky
 Nominated British Independent Film Awards Best British Short 2005 Pitch Perfect
 Runner Up TCM Classic Shorts Film Competition  2005 The Clap
 Nominated British Independent Film Awards Best British Short 2004 6.6.04

2009(I)

 Screening: 63rd Edinburgh International Film Festival: Filmhouse, Sunday 19 June 2009, 11:30am

2008(II)

 London Screening: 6th London Short Film Festival, Institute of Contemporary Arts, Friday 16 January 2009, 6.30pm

2008(I)

 London Screening: Curzon Mayfair, Thursday 23 October 2008, 7pm 
 62nd Edinburgh International Film Festival Screening: Filmhouse, Wednesday 25 June 2008, 5:15pm

2007

 London Screening: Curzon Mayfair, Thursday 11 October 2007, 6.30pm 
 61st Edinburgh International Film Festival Screening: Cameo Cinema, Monday 20 August 2007, 2pm

2006

 London Screening: Curzon Mayfair, Thursday 5 October 2006 at 18:30
 60th Edinburgh International Film Festival Screening: Cameo Cinema, Tuesday 22 August 2006

2005

 London Screening: Curzon Mayfair, Thursday 31 October 2005 at 18:30
 59th Edinburgh International Film Festival Screening: Cameo Cinema
 11th Bristol International Short Film Festival (Brief Encounters) Screening: Watershed Cinema 1, Friday 25 November 2005 at 17:30
 11th Bristol International Short Film Festival (Brief Encounters) Screening: Watershed Cinema 1, Saturday 26 November 2005 at 11:45

2004

 58th Edinburgh International Film Festival Screening: Cameo Cinema 1, on Friday 27 August 2004 at 14:00

2003

London Screening: Curzon Soho, Monday 7 April 2003 at 6pm

References

External links
 UK Film Council
 Maya Vision International
 Films
 Film 4

British film awards
Film archives in the United Kingdom
Film preservation
Film production companies of the United Kingdom
2002 establishments in the United Kingdom